Townson (also Tounson) is a surname. Notable people with this surname include:

 Chris Townson (1947–2008), American musician and illustrator
 Des Townson (1934–2008), New Zealand yacht designer
 Hazel Townson (1928–2010), English author
 John Townson (died 1835), Australian army officer
 Kevin Townson (born 1983), English footballer
 Robert Townson (disambiguation), several people
 Ronald Townson (1933–2001), American singer
 Thomas Townson (1715–1792), English priest
 George Townson (born 1997), Cyber Security

See also 
 Townson, Queensland, Lockyer Valley Region, Australia